The 1963–64 Hellenic Football League season was the 11th in the history of the Hellenic Football League, a football competition in England.

Premier Division

The Premier Division featured 14 clubs which competed in the division last season, along with four new clubs:
Amersham Town, promoted from Division One
Didcot Town, joined from the Metropolitan League
Morris Motors, promoted from Division One
Swindon Town 'A'

League table

Division One

The Division One featured 9 clubs which competed in the division last season, along with 1 new club:
Pressed Steel, relegated from the Premier Division

League table

References

External links
 Hellenic Football League

1963-64
H